Statistics of Allsvenskan in season 1982.

Overview
The league was contested by 12 teams, with IFK Göteborg winning the league and the Swedish championship after the playoffs.

League table

Results

Allsvenskan play-offs
The 1982 Allsvenskan play-offs was the first edition of the competition. The eight best placed teams from Allsvenskan  qualified to the competition. Allsvenskan champions IFK Göteborg won the competition and the Swedish championship after defeating league runners-up Hammarby IF.

Quarter-finals

First leg

Second leg

Semi-finals

First leg

Second leg

Final

Relegation play-offs

Season statistics

Top scorers

Footnotes

References 

Allsvenskan seasons
Swed
Swed
1